Sundara Manamadhe Bharli is an Indian Marathi television series. It is produced by Manava Naik under the banner of Strawberry Pictures.

Plot 
Latika is a very warm-hearted and intelligent girl filled with optimism. A perfect daughter, sister and a friend. Even though her life looks ideal, she faces several rejections for marriage alliances due to her obesity. Whereas Abhimanyu is a fitness enthusiast who wants everyone to be healthy.

Cast 
 Akshaya Naik as Latika Abhimanyu Jahagirdar (Lati)
 Sameer Paranjape as Abhimanyu Uttamrao Jahagirdar (Abhya)
 Kunal Dhumal as Devvrat Karkhanis (Deva)
 Pooja Purandare as Kamini (Miss Nashik)
 Prakash Dhotre as Uttamrao "Appa" Jahagirdar (Abhimanyu's father)
 Atisha Naik as Indumati Uttamrao Jahagirdar (Abhimanyu's mother)
 Gauri Kiran as Surekha Dhumal
 Umesh Damle as Bapu (Latika's father) 
 Poonam Chaudhari-Patil as Jayashree (Latika's mother)
 Chaitanya Bagul as Vickya
 Hrishikesh Shelar as Daulat Nimbalkar
 Pranav Prabhakar as Ashutosh Uttamrao Jahagirdar (Abhimanyu's elder brother)
 Pramiti Narke / Sharvari Pendharkar as Hema Ashutosh Jahagirdar (Ashutosh's wife)
 Sandesh Uppasham as Sajjan
 Kalpesh Patil as Kalpya
 Mukund More as Mukya
 Aditi Dravid as Nandini
 Nikhil Rahane as Ravi (Abhimanyu's friend)
 Radha Sagar as Abhilasha (Abhimanyu's new boss)
 Sanjay Kulkarni as MK (Abhimanyu's boss)
 Chitra Kulkarni as Sajjan's mother
 Dhananjay Wable / Umesh Bolake as Daulat's father
 Swanandi Tikekar as Prateeksha, Abhilasha's lawyer

Production

Casting 
Akshaya Naik and Sameer Paranjape were selected for the roles of Latika and Abhimanyu, respectively. Later, Kunal Dhumal replaced Sameer Paranjape as a new lead of the show. Atisha Naik is selected for the role of Indumati.

Location 
The series is backdrop of village. The series is mainly filmed on the sets created at Nashik.

Adaptations

References

External links 
 
 Sundara Manamadhe Bharli at Voot

Marathi-language television shows
2020 Indian television series debuts
Colors Marathi original programming